Schooled magazine was a monthly magazine based in Provo, Utah, United States and was in publication from 3 September 2003 to 2010. The magazine is owned and managed by Russ Taylor, who acquired the title in October 2004.

Schooled, with the motto "for the student, by the student", was written for and by students and focuses on college student life. It targeted students at Brigham Young University and Utah Valley State College.

The magazine's official website indicates that the last issue published was in Spring 2010.

References

External links
 

Monthly magazines published in the United States
Student magazines published in the United States
Brigham Young University
Magazines established in 2003
Magazines published in Utah
Mass media in Salt Lake City
Utah Valley University